Raymond-Theodore Troplong (October 8, 1795 – March 1, 1869) was a French Bonapartist politician of the Second French Empire. He served as President of the Senate of France (1852–1869) and was a member of the Académie des sciences morales et politiques.

Life 
Raymond-Theodore Troplong was born in 1795. His career started in 1819, when he became a lawyer. In 1835, he was appointed advisor of the Court of Cassation, while in 1840, he became a member of the Academy of Moral and Political Sciences (Legislation section). He also entered the so-called Chamber of Peers in 1846, while in 1852 he became president of the Court of Cassation.

Troplong co-authored the original text of the French Constitution of 1852 and he was also appointed senator on January 23, 1852. Then he became rapporteur of the sénatus-consulte under Napoleon III (Second French Empire); Troplong legitimized Napoleon III's coup d'état with this argument:

He replaced the prince Jerome Bonaparte when he resigned from his position of President of the Senate of France  on December 30, 1852. He retained this function for most of the Second French Empire (1852-1870) until his death in 1869. In 1858, he was appointed member of the Conseil privé de l'Empereur (i.e. the "Private Council of the Emperor").

Raymond-Theodore Troplong, who was one of the leading jurists of his time (he's been described as the "Portalis of the Second Empire") wrote many books about law, in which he defended a conception of law mixed with philosophy and history. He knew and discussed the work of Friedrich Carl von Savigny, the founder of the German "Ecole historique du droit", and defended neighboring but distinct positions, which seems to prove, despite what has been argued by certain authors (Julien Bonnecase, The School of Exegesis in Civil Law, 1924) his influence on the legal doctrine. In France, the existence and fecundity of a French "School of Law", whose influence is far from being marginal, is still perceived today.

He was a skilled and popular writer, but he was also a very poor speaker, which earned him the sarcasm of Prosper Mérimée, who once said: "Our President, aptly named Troplong" (in French, trop long means "too long").

After death, he wanted to be buried together with his only daughter Joséphine Marie-Louise, who had died in Plombières-les-Bains in October 1839 when she was in that city with her parents for a few days of relaxation; the little girl was just eight years old. The wife of the senator and mother of the girl (1805-1881) also rests in that place. Today, the French Senate still takes care of the maintenance of the tomb.

Works
 De la souveraineté des ducs de Lorraine sur le Barois mouvant et de l'inaliénabilité de leur domaine dans cette partie de leur États. Grimblot, Nancy, 1832.
 
 Des privilèges et hypothèques ou commentaires du titre XVIII du livre III du Code Civil, Hingray, Paris, 1833
 Commentaire de la vente, 1833.
 De la vente ou commentaire du titre VI du livre III du Code civil, Hingray, Paris, 1834 (5e éd. mise en rapport avec la loi du 23 mars 1855 sur la transcription, Paris, 1856).
 
 De la nécessité de réformer les études historiques applicables au droit français
 
 .
 
 Des pouvoirs de l'État sur l'enregistrement d'après l'Ancien Droit public français, Hingray, Paris, 1844.
 Du prêt : commentaire du titre X du livre III du Code civil, Hingray, Paris, 1845.
 Du dépôt et du séquestre et des contrats aléatoires : commentaire des titres XI et .XII du Livre III du Code civil, Hingray, Paris, 1845.
 Du mandat : commentaire du titre XIII du livre III du Code civil, Hingray, Paris, 1846.
 Du cautionnement et des transactions : commentaire des titres XIV et XV du Livre III du Code Civil, Hingray, Paris, 1846.
 Contraintes par corps en matière civile et de commerce : commentaire du titre XVI du libre III du Code civil, Hingray, Paris, 1847.
 Du nantissement, du gage et de l'antichrèse : commentaire du titre XVII du livre III du Code civil, Hingray, Paris, 1847.
 De la propriété d'après le Code civil, Pagnerre, Paris, 1848.
 Du contrat de mariage et des droits respectifs des époux : commentaire du titre V du livre III dit Code civil, Hingray. Paris, 1850.
 
 Table alphabétique et analytique dit commentaire du titre V du livre III du Code civil, du contrat de mariage et des droits respectifs des époux, Table publiée avec la seconde édition de l'ouvrage, Hingray, Paris, 1851.
 * 
 Du principe d'autorité depuis 1789, les marchands de nouveautés, Paris, 1853.

References

External links
 Works by Troplong at the Internet Archive.

1795 births
1869 deaths
People from Saint-Gaudens, Haute-Garonne
Politicians from Occitania (administrative region)
Bonapartists
Members of the Chamber of Peers of the July Monarchy
French Senators of the Second Empire
Presidents of the Senate (France)
Members of the Académie des sciences morales et politiques